Ardenna is a genus of seabirds in the family Procellariidae. These medium-sized shearwater species were formerly included in the genus Puffinus.

Taxonomy
A phylogenetic analysis using mitochondrial DNA published in 2004 found that Puffinus contained two distinct clades and was polyphyletic. To create monophyletic genera a group of species were moved into Ardenna, a genus that had been introduced in 1853 by Ludwig Reichenbach with the great shearwater as the type species. Reichenbach cites the Italian naturalist Ulisse Aldrovandi who in 1603 used the spelling "Artenna" for a seabird. Recent genomic studies have validated the phylogenetic distinction between Ardenna and Puffinus.

Species
The genus contains these seven living species:

Phylogeny
Phylogeny based on a study by Joan Ferrer Obiol and collaborators published in 2022.

References

 
Bird genera

Taxa named by Ludwig Reichenbach